"Into the Groove" is a song recorded by American singer Madonna, and featured on the 1985 film Desperately Seeking Susan. Written and produced by both Madonna and Stephen Bray, the main inspiration behind the song was the dance floor; the singer wrote it while watching a Latin American man whom she was attracted to. Its instrumentation features synthesizers and drum machines, with Madonna's voice beings double tracked on the chorus. Sexual innuendos and undertones are present throughout the lyrics, which are written as an invitation to dance with the singer. Originally written for her friend Mark Kamins, Madonna later decided to use it on the film, as one of the scenes needed a dance song. It was later added to the 1985 international re-issue of her second studio album, Like a Virgin (1984), and remixed for her compilations You Can Dance (1987), and The Immaculate Collection (1990).

Not wanting to draw more attention away from the Like a Virgin album and the release of "Crazy for You", Warner Bros. Records did not give "Into the Groove" an official release in the United States, thus making it ineligible to enter the Billboard Hot 100. It was eventually released as the B-side to the 12" maxi-single of "Angel", the third official single from Like a Virgin, and reached the first spot of Billboards Hot Dance Singles Sales chart. In the United Kingdom, "Into the Groove" became Madonna's first number one hit, and remains her best-selling single. It was also successful throughout Europe, topping the charts in Austria, Ireland, Italy, and the Netherlands. Critically acclaimed since its release, "Into the Groove" was voted  the best dance single from the 1980s decade in a Billboard poll, and has been cited by multiple publications as Madonna's best single. 

While no official music video was shot, a compilation made up of scenes from Desperately Seeking Susan was created to accompany the release, and received heavy rotation on MTV. Madonna has performed "Into the Groove" on six of her concert tours, the last being 2015–2016's Rebel Heart Tour. It has been covered and sampled by many artists, notably Australian singer Dannii Minogue, who released a mashup of "Into The Groove" and her 2003 single "Don't Wanna Lose This Feeling".

Background and recording 

"Into the Groove" was written and produced by Madonna and her then-boyfriend Stephen Bray. In 1984, the singer was living in Avenue-B, and she revealed to having "rushed" the writing process because "there was this gorgeous Puerto Rican boy [living across her] that I wanted to go out on a date with, and I just wanted to get [the song] over with [...] [it] was finished just before my last date with him". One of the main inspirations was the dance floor, which she described as a "magical" place, adding that "I started off wanting to be a dancer, so that had a lot to do. The freedom that I always feel when I'm dancing, that feeling of inhabiting your body, letting yourself go, expressing yourself through music [...] that came to me as the primary inspiration for 'Into the Groove'". After finishing the track, Brey and Madonna recorded a demo, paid by her friend Mark Kamins; the idea was to modify the demo so Cheyne, Kamins fifteen-year old protégée, could sing and record it. 

Around the same time, director Susan Seidelman was looking for actresses to play the title role in her film Desperately Seeking Susan; having turned down Diane Keaton, Melanie Griffith, and Kelly McGillis, Seidelmen decided to cast Madonna, whom she had met in the "downtown music scene", and felt had an "interesting buzz". While shooting one scene at Danceteria nightclub, a dance song was needed and Madonna suggested "Into the Groove", so she and Bray modified some of the demo's lyrics and recorded the track. Kamins was furious when he found out, as the singer hadn’t even told him she had decided to use it herself; Madonna retorted: "I'm tough, I'm ambitious and I know exactly what I want. If that makes me a bitch, that's okay".
 
Recording took place at Sigma Sound Studios; of the process, Bray recalled that he would first work on the song's "rib cage and the skeleton [music]", and Madonna would take care of the "last things like the eyebrows and the haircut [lyrics]". The singer's friend Erika Belle, who was present during the recording sessions, remembered that, at one point, Bray was facing difficulties with the bridge of the song, as the melody he had come up with was not syncing with the rest of the composition. Madonna then stepped up to the microphone and sang the words Live out your fantasy here with me, seemingly solving the problem; Belle recalled being "awestruck" at the fact that "[the song] just seemed to come out of her". Due to contractual label reasons, "Into the Groove" was not included on the official Desperately Seeking Susan soundtrack, but was instead added to the 1985 international re-issue of Madonna's second studio album, Like a Virgin (1984). It was also included on her compilation albums The Immaculate Collection (1990), and Celebration (2009).

Composition and remixes 
Musically, "Into the Groove" is a dance-pop song that begins with a spoken introduction by Madonna, the sound of drums, and a synth bassline. This is followed by the chorus, where the singer's voice is double tracked and the treble is increased by a notch; the synth line counterpoints the main tune, adding a contrast effect. The bridge Live out your fantasy here with me has Madonna using her vocals in a lower register, alongside the main ones. According to the sheet music published in Musicnotes.com by Alfred Publishing Co. Inc., "Into the Groove" is set in the time signature of common time with a medium tempo of 116 beats per minute. It is composed in the key of C minor, with Madonna's voice spanning from the low-tone of C4 to the high-tone of D5. The song has a basic sequence of Cm7–B/C–Cm7–A as its chord progression.

The "simple" lyrics, which invite the listener to dance with the singer, carry sexual innuendos and undertones; Rikky Rooksby, author of Madonna: the complete guide to her music, argued that, similar to "Like a Virgin", "Into the Groove" counts with a lyrical hook aimed at shy girls. He held that the line At night I lock the door so no-one else can see implied that Madonna was not as "brazen as her provocative image suggested". By his part, author Marc Andrews felt the lyrics' theme of "dance floor liberation" works as a call to all minorities, specifically the gay community. Similarly, Clive Barker, one of the authors of In New Theatre Quarterly 46, Part 2, said that the line Only when I'm dancing can I feel this free expresses the "freedom that a dance floor brings about"; he also pointed out that a neume that "blurred the boundaries of reality and brings one closer to the world of fantasy", can be found on the bridge.

"Into the Groove" was first remixed by Shep Pettibone for You Can Dance (1987), Madonna's first remix compilation. In this remix, overdubs are present alongside the continuous repetition of the phrase c'mon. Aditionally, the first verse does not start until about ninety seconds into the song. After the first Now I know you're mine line is sung, there is a percussion break, and repetition of the phrases step to the beat and c'mon. The last verse incorporates echoing on the vocals, causing overlap of the phrases; it ends with instrumentation from congas, whistles and timbales. Pettibone collaborated with  Goh Hotoda in another remix of the song, which was included on 1990's The Immaculate Collection. In 2003, "Into the Hollywood Groove", a mashup of "Into the Groove" and "Hollywood", was used for a Gap ad featuring Madonna and rapper Missy Elliott; it was then added to Madonna's second remix compilation, Remixed & Revisited. An edited "truncated take" of the You Can Dance remix was included on the singer's third remix compilation, Finally Enough Love: 50 Number Ones (2022), this time incorporating stuttering vocals.

Critical reception 

"Into the Groove" has been acclaimed since its release. For Rikky Rooksby it's her "first great single" that "will make you feel like you're a winner [...] [And that's] one of the best things pop music can do for ya ". While J. Randy Taraborrelli, author of Madonna: An Intimate Biography, said the song demonstrated Madonna's ability to create "infectious dance music", Clive Barker and Simon Trussler referred to it as the first disco-anthem of the 1980s. A similar opinion was shared by Matthew Rettenmund, author of Totally Awesome 80s: A Lexicon of the Music, Videos, Movies, TV Shows, Stars, and Trends of that Decadent Decade, who named "Into the Groove" the "ultimate" 1980s song, that also "cemented [Madonna's] place as the dancing queen of the era". In Goodbye 20th Century: A Biography of Sonic Youth, David Browne classified the single as an "ebullient, wonderfully pushy hit". Dawn Keetley and John Pettigrew, authors of Public Women, Public Words: A Documentary History of American Feminism, called it "mesmerizing". In 1001 Songs: The Great Songs of All Time and the Artists, Stories and Secrets, Toby Cresswell said of the song: "[A] sweet, limited white tune on the top, and there's Madonna – all the right-shop chic – dragging the straight world into this subterranean paradise. All the magic of the eighties is right here". From AllMusic, Stacia Proefrock opined it was an "infectious, fluffy dance-pop confection that drew legions of fans, as well as considerable backlash from those supposedly too sophisticated to be able to enjoy her music".

Retrospective reviews have been largely positive. Slant Magazine’s reviewer named it the 29th greatest dance song, and the singer's third best single; on both occasions he wrote that: "she's unapologetically single-minded; it's love she's looking for, not just a dance partner [...] The song —and Madonna's performance—are that good". In 2009 the staff of Blender placed it at number 90 on the magazine's list of "The 500 Greatest Songs Since You Were Born"; "[Madonna] is not just asking you to dance. She is commanding you to [...] Sounding totally at home amid woodblock percussion and sunset synths, [her] voice bursts with the optimism of early evening", the review read. On Rolling Stones 2021 list, it came in at number 121 and was named "the greatest dance-pop invitation of the Eighties". In 2012 The Guardians Nosheen Iqbal asked, "had there ever been a hotter summons to the dancefloor [than 'Into the Groove']? It was the soundtrack to her first (and last) great cinema moment". The song was voted by the British public as the nation's 19th favorite 1980s number one in a 2015 poll for ITV.

Matthew Jacobs from HuffPost placed the song at the tenth position in his ranking of Madonna's singles; calling it her "finest pre-'Vogue' dance-floor anthem", Jacobs added that "no one cites 'Angel' as one of Madonna’s more memorable singles. But 'Into the Groove' is [...] the ultimate mid-'80s call to action". In Gay Star Newss 2014 ranking of Madonna’s songs, the single came in at number 8. Jude Rogers from The Guardian placed it at number 17 in her 2018 ranking of Madonna singles. The Tabs Harrison Brocklehurst referred to "Into the Groove" as "pure pop perfection […] [f]rom start to finish"; in 2022 he named it Madonna's 15th best. In 2018 it was named the singer's 9th greatest single by Entertainment Weeklys Chuck Arnold, who opined that "Madonna may have never truly conquered the acting world [...] but she definitely made some killer movie music", citing "Into the Groove" as an example. In 2012 it was deemed "magnetic, comely, cool, [and] compulsively danceable", and Madonna's 4th best, by Louis Virtel from The Backlot. According to the staff of Rolling Stone in 2016, it's the singer's second best single; "it still sounds like a low-budget demo – those breakbeats, the desperate edge in her voice when she drones, 'Now I know you're mine' – but that raw power is what makes it her definitive you-can-dance track". 

"Into the Groove" was named the best dance single from the 1980s on Billboards "Music of the '80s" poll; it was also named Madonna's finest by both PinkNewss Nayer Missim, and Billboards Andrew Unterberger; the former wrote that "[she] has probably sung more emotional, more danceable, more experimental and technically 'better' songs, but as a distillation of pure pop joy, 'Into the Groove' more than earns its place as her very best single", while according to the latter, "no other artist in pop history has understood as well that the lines that separate music, dancing, sex and love into discrete entities are tenuous at best, and in 'Into the Groove', all four elements are continuously smashing into each other, becoming virtually interchangeable". "Into the Groove" was included in 1001 Songs: You Must Hear Before You Die by Robert Dimery as well as Bruce Pollock's Rock Song Index: The 7500 Most Important Songs for the Rock & Roll Era.

Chart performance 

In the United States, "Material Girl" and "Crazy for You" were released only a couple of months apart. Fearing “over-saturation”, executives at Warner Bros. Records decided not to release "Into the Groove" officially. Instead, it became the B-side of the 12" maxi-single of "Angel", the third official Like a Virgin single, making it ineligible to enter the Billboard Hot 100 and Hot Singles Sales charts. The "Angel"/"Into the Groove" release  debuted at number 40 on the Hot Dance Club Songs chart on June 1, 1985 and at number 10 of the Dance Singles Sales chart one week later. By the end of the month, “Into the Groove” had reached the first position on both charts, becoming Madonna's fourth number one on the former. The song also charted on Billboards Hot R&B/Hip-Hop Songs, peaking at number 19 the week of July 27. Just three days later, "Angel"/"Into the Groove" was certified gold by the Recording Industry Association of America (RIAA) for shipment of one million copies across the US ― the requirement for a gold single prior to 1989. It became the fourth 12" single to be certified gold after Donna Summer and Barbra Streisand's "No More Tears (Enough Is Enough)" (1979), Kurtis Blow's "The Breaks (1980), and Frankie Smith's "Double Dutch Bus" (1981). By December, Billboard reported that the single had sold over 600,000 copies and was number 12 on the year-end Dance charts.

In the United Kingdom, "Into the Groove" debuted at number 4 on the UK Singles Chart on July 27, 1985, becoming the highest debuting single for any female artist in the chart's history at the time. It peaked at number one the week of August 3 and remained there for four weeks; it spent 14 weeks on the chart overall. During its stay at number one, the re-release of "Holiday" reached the chart's second spot; thus Madonna became the first female artist in UK chart history to hold the top two positions simultaneously. "Into the Groove" was certified gold by the British Phonographic Industry (BPI) for shipment of 500,000 copies. It was the year's third most successful single, behind Jennifer Rush's "The Power of Love", and Elaine Paige's and Barbara Dickson's "I Know Him So Well". With sales of over 957,000 copies, including physical, downloads and streaming, "Into the Groove" is Madonnna's best-selling single in the United Kingdom as of August 2018. In Australia, "Angel"/"Into the Groove" reached the top of the Kent Music Report chart and ended the year as the second best-selling single of 1985. The single found success across Europe as well, topping the charts in Ireland, Italy, the Netherlands, and Spain, and peaking within the top three of France, Germany, and Switzerland. "Into the Groove" was less successful in Japan, where it barely cracked the top 40.

Music video 
No official music video was shot for "Into the Groove"; instead, a clip consisting of compiled scenes and footage from Desperately Seeking Susan ―the lyrics matching the images and scenes― was put together by Doug Dowdle from Parallax Productions, a company that specialized in movie-related music videos during the 1980s. It was added to MTV on the week of March 30, 1985.

Despite naming it "basic" and "nowhere near as high-concept" as Madonna's previous music videos, author James King wrote in Fast Times and Excellent Adventures: The Surprising History of the '80s Teen Movie that the clip proved "just how striking Desperately Seeking Susan is visually", comparing it to "Purple Rain" (1984) by Prince and the Revolution. He concluded that "the prospect of the attitude-filled Madonna [...] on the big screen was impossible to resist", thus the video was successful on MTV. John Fiske, author of Television Culture, pointed out that, just like Desperately Seeking Susan, "['Into the Groove'] is almost exclusively about style" and "women seeking control over their social identity". On a similar note, Outs Julien Sauvalle named it one of Madonna's "most stylish" music videos. "Into the Groove" can be found on Madonna's 2009 compilation Celebration: The Video Collection.

Live performances 

Madonnna has performed "Into the Groove" on six of her concert tours: Virgin (1985), Who's That Girl (1987), Blond Ambition (1990), Re-Invention (2004), Sticky & Sweet (2008―2009), and Rebel Heart (2015―2016). On the first one, she wore lace leggings, crucifixes on her neck and ears, and played tambourine backed by two male dancers. From the Observer–Reporter, Terry Hazlett said it was the concert's best number. The performance of the song at Detroit's Cobo Arena was included on the Madonna Live: The Virgin Tour video release. On July 13, 1985, Madonna sang "Into the Groove" at the Philadelphia Live Aid benefit concert, held at John F. Kennedy Stadium; her outfit consisted of flowery trousers, a cutoff shirt, and long white jacket. Halfway through the performance, the singer joked that she would not take her jacket off because "[the media] might hold it against me ten years from now".

The song's performance on the Who's That Girl World Tour saw Madonna decked out in a fringed pink jacket decorated with colorful items, including a letter U, a tin of Campbell's soup, and the word DANCE ― a play-on-words of the phrase "You Can Dance". On his review of the Washington, D.C. concert, the Washington Posts Richard Harrington cited the song as one of the show's "tingling dance numbers", comparing it to a workout. Two different performances were included on the videos Who's That Girl: Live in Japan, filmed in Tokyo on June, and Ciao Italia: Live from Italy, filmed in Turin on September. On the Blond Ambition World Tour, following a speech about condoms and safe sex, Madonna sang "Into the Groove" while "bumping and grinding through some Lambada steps" with a male dancer; she wore a black mini-dress trimmed and stitched with a stuffed West African stork called the marabou. Harrington highlighted "Into the Groove" as one of the tour's "big production numbers". Two different performances can be found in Blond Ambition Japan Tour 90, taped in Yokohama, and Blond Ambition World Tour Live, taped in Nice. 

"Into the Groove" was given a Scottish theme and remixed with a "more complex beat" for the Re-Invention World Tour; the number had the singer and troupe dressed in kilts, a live bagpiper, drum corps, and a recorded appearance by Missy Elliott. Glenn Gamboa from Newsday pointed the song was re-imagined as a "powerful dance piece instead of simply a dance-pop trifle". A performance of "Into the Groove" from this tour can be found on the I'm Going to Tell You a Secret live album and documentary (2006). 

A "pumping club mix" of the song, that sampled Newcleus' "Jam on It" (1984), and The Sugarhill Gang's "Apache" (1981), was sung on the Sticky & Sweet Tour. Madonnna wore 1980s-styled gym shorts, played Double Dutch, and danced on a pole mounted on a mobile DJ booth, while the backdrop screens showed artwork by artist Keith Haring. The Denver Posts Ricardo Baca referred to the number as a "delightful explosion of color [...] pure pop goodness". The performance was included on the Sticky & Sweet Tour live album release (2010), recorded during the four concerts in Buenos Aires, Argentina. A slow, cumbia and salsa-fueled medley of "Dress You Up", "Into the Groove", and "Lucky Star" (1983) was included on the Rebel Heart Tour. The number featured Day of the Dead iconography and found Madonna, decked out in a long dress with a black shawl and a black hat, joined by a Mexican-themed dance crew. Billboards Joe Lynch opined that "the maracas might have been a little much, but the crisp Spanish guitar successfully made the songs sound newly organic". The performance at the March 19–20, 2016 shows in Sydney's Allphones Arena was recorded and released in Madonna's fifth live album, Rebel Heart Tour (2017). During a 2009 interview with Rolling Stone, Madonna revealed that "Into the Groove" is a song she "feel[s] retarded singing".

Cover versions and samples 

The cast of American children's television program Kids Incorporated sang the track on 1985. Italian singer Mina included a rendition of "Into the Groove" on her 1988 album Ridi Pagliaccio. One year later, it was covered by American Alternative rock band Sonic Youth as "Into the Groove(y)" for their album The Whitey Album; AllMusic's Bradley Torreano felt the rendition "manage[s] to mold a fantastic dirge out of the original". The song was recorded by Dale Bozzio, former lead singer of American new wave band Missing Persons, for 2000's Virgin Voices: A Tribute To Madonna, Vol. 2. In 2002, French–Dutch group Mad'House did a Eurodance take on the single, that was included on their album Absolutely Mad. That same year, French band Superbus covered it for their album Aéromusical. In 2007, American singer Jeremy Jay sang "Into the Groove" for Through the Wilderness: A Tribute to Madonna and, one year later, it was covered by American band The Magic Droid in their album What's Your Medium? In "Puppet Master" (2013), the seventh episode of the fifth season of American television series Glee, the song was performed by Lea Michele, Naya Rivera, Demi Lovato, and Adam Lambert.

In 2003, Australian singer Dannii Minogue sampled "Into the Groove" on her single "Don't Wanna Lose This Feeling"; it was the first time Madonna approved a sample of one of her songs. Minogue recalled that "I was the first [to use Madonna as a sample]. To this day I still can’t believe it! [...] 'Into the Groove' is just legendary". On December 27, 2021, Madonna accused American rapper Tory Lanez of sampling the track without her permission on his song "Pluto’s Last Comet"; "Read your messages for illegal usage of my song get into the groove!", the singer commented on one of Lanez Instagram posts. It was never confirmed if she had pursued a copyright infringement suit against Lanez, or sought writing credits.

Track listing and formats 

UK 7" single / UK 7" Limited Edition Picture Disc
"Into the Groove" (Single Version) – 4:43
"Shoo-Bee-Doo" (LP Version) – 5:16

Japanese 7" single
"Into the Groove" (Single Version) – 4:43
"Physical Attraction" (Single Edit) – 3:55

German 3" CD single (1989)
 "Into the Groove" (Single Version) – 4:43
 "Who's That Girl" (Extended Version) – 6:29
 "Causing a Commotion" (Silver Screen Mix) – 6:39

You Can Dance promo 12" single (1987)
"Into the Groove" (Extended Remix) – 8:31
"Into the Groove" (Remix Dub) – 6:22
"Everybody" (Extended Remix) – 7:06

UK 12" single
"Into the Groove" (Single Version) – 4:43
"Everybody" (LP Version) – 4:52
"Shoo-Bee-Doo" (LP Version) – 5:16

Credits and personnel 
Madonna – writer, vocals, producer
Stephen Bray – writer, producer
Shep Pettibone – audio mixing, additional production, audio editing
Andy Wallace – remix engineering
The Latin Rascals – audio editing
Herb Ritts – photography

These credits are adapted from the liner notes of You Can Dance and the 1985 re-issue of Like a Virgin.

Charts

Weekly charts

Year-end charts

Decade-end charts

Certifications and sales

References

Bibliography 

1984 songs
1985 singles
Dutch Top 40 number-one singles
Irish Singles Chart number-one singles
Madonna songs
Number-one singles in Australia
Number-one singles in Iceland
Number-one singles in Italy
Number-one singles in New Zealand
Number-one singles in Spain
Oricon International Singles Chart number-one singles
Sire Records singles
Song recordings produced by Madonna
Song recordings produced by Stephen Bray
Songs about dancing
Songs written by Madonna
Songs written by Stephen Bray
Songs written for films
UK Singles Chart number-one singles
Warner Records singles